Dozier Dome is a granite dome, in the Tuolumne Meadows region of Yosemite National Park. It is named after Jeff Dozier.

Finding Dozier Dome

From the road, it is scarce visible, rarely visited due to the unmarked approach, and no trails leading to its base. It between Medlicott Dome and Pywiack Domes.

From Highway 120, Dozier Dome is the lesser altitude, seen to the right of Medlicott.

Hiking up the dome

One may hike up Dozier Dome, though be aware, the slope is class 3 — not for the faint of heart.

Rock climbing

Dozier Dome is one of the safest bolted areas of Tuolumne Meadows.

References

External links and references

 The approach to Dozier Dome
 More on the approach
 On the rock climbing

Granite domes of Yosemite National Park